Nayes, also named "En Nayes",  is a locality in the municipality of Vouvry, Switzerland.

References 

Geography of Valais